Prokudino is a rural locality (a village) in Ilyinskoye Rural Settlement, Kolchuginsky District, Vladimir Oblast, Russia. The population was 32 as of 2010. There are 7 streets.

Geography 
Prokudino is located 10 km north of Kolchugino (the district's administrative centre) by road. Davydovskoye is the nearest rural locality.

References 

Rural localities in Kolchuginsky District